Korshinskia is a genus of flowering plants belonging to the family Apiaceae. It is also in the Tribe Pleurospermeae.

Its native range is Central Asia and Afghanistan. It is found in the countries of Afghanistan, Iran, Iraq, Kyrgyzstan, Tajikistan, Turkmenistan and Uzbekistan.

The genus name of Korshinskia is in honour of Sergéi Korzhinski (1861–1900), a Russian botanist who studied plant distribution, professor at the university in Tomsk and then he later worked at a botanical garden and botanical museum in Saint Petersburg.
It was first described and published in Trudy Imp. S.-Peterburgsk. Bot. Sada Vol.18 on page 59 in 1900.

Species
According to Kew;
Korshinskia assyriaca 
Korshinskia kopetdaghensis 
Korshinskia olgae 
Korshinskia rapifera

References

Apioideae
Apioideae genera
Flora of Central Asia
Flora of Western Asia